Guilherme Gimenez de Souza (18 June 1995 – 28 November 2016), simply known as Gimenez, was a Brazilian footballer who last played for Chapecoense. Mainly a right back, he also played as a defensive midfielder.

Gimenez was one of the victims when LaMia Airlines Flight 2933 crashed on 28 November 2016.

Club career
Born in Ribeirão Preto, São Paulo, Gimenez represented Olé Brasil and Comercial-SP as a youth. Promoted to the latter's first team in the middle of 2013, he made his senior debut on 21 July of that year by starting in a 0–0 Copa Paulista away draw against Independente de Limeira.

Gimenez also appeared twice on the bench for two 2014 Campeonato Paulista matches before rescinding his contract on 17 April 2014, due to unpaid wages. Eight days later, he signed a three-year contract with cross-town rivals Botafogo-SP.

Gimenez scored his first senior goal on 5 April 2015, netting the last in a 2–0 home win against São Paulo for the Paulistão championship. In June, he was bought by a group of businessmen and was signed by Série A club Goiás. He made his top tier debut on 18 July, being booked in a 1–2 away loss against Internacional.

Gimenez featured in 23 matches for the Esmeraldino, suffering relegation at the end of the campaign. On 17 December 2015, he signed a one-year contract with fellow top level club Chapecoense.

Death
On 28 November 2016, whilst at the service of Chapecoense, Gimenez was among the fatalities of the LaMia Airlines Flight 2933 accident in the Colombian village of Cerro Gordo, La Unión, Antioquia.

Career statistics

Honours
Chapecoense
Campeonato Catarinense: 2016
Copa Sudamericana: 2016 (posthumously)

References

External links

1995 births
2016 deaths
Brazilian footballers
People from Ribeirão Preto
Association football defenders
Association football midfielders
Campeonato Brasileiro Série A players
Comercial Futebol Clube (Ribeirão Preto) players
Botafogo Futebol Clube (SP) players
Goiás Esporte Clube players
Associação Chapecoense de Futebol players
Footballers killed in the LaMia Flight 2933 crash
Footballers from São Paulo (state)